Michael Dywane Jackson Dyson (April 12, 1969 – May 12, 2017) was an American football wide receiver. Jackson was selected by the Cleveland Browns in the sixth round of the 1991 NFL Draft. He played college football at The University of Southern Mississippi. Jackson played in eight seasons in the National Football League (NFL), from 1991 to 1998, for the Browns and the Baltimore Ravens. Jackson signed a one-year contract with the Seattle Seahawks to play the 1999 season, but was cut at the end of the preseason.

Career
In college, Jackson was teammates with quarterback Brett Favre during the 1989 and 1990 seasons.

He was an immediate contributor for the Cleveland Browns under then head coach Bill Belichick with 3 seasons over 40 catches, 710 yards, and 7 TD. He had a then career-best season in 1993 when he hauled in 41 catches for 756 yards with 8 TD.

Between the first two games of the 1993 regular season, he briefly changed his last name to his father's surname Dyson before reverting to Jackson which was his mother's maiden name. The change of heart was the result of having received letters from youngsters who identified with him by his Jackson name.

In 1996, Jackson was tied with San Diego Chargers wide receiver Tony Martin for most receiving touchdowns in the NFL with 14. He also had career highs with 76 catches and 1,201 yards.

Jackson was a member of Alpha Phi Alpha fraternity. He served as mayor of his hometown, Tangipahoa, Louisiana, from 2009 through 2012.

On August 12, 1999 Jackson signed a one-year contract with the Seattle Seahawks after their star wide receiver Joey Galloway continued his holdout.  Jackson played in all four preseason games with the Seahawks, catching a 23-yard touchdown against the Cardinals.  Jackson was let go on September 6, 1999, in the preseason cut down to the 53-man roster.

Death
Jackson was killed in a motorcycle accident in the early morning hours of May 12, 2017. He was riding his motorcycle at high speed on US 51 in Tangipahoa, Louisiana when he struck the driver side of a vehicle that was backing out of a driveway. The high impact of the collision also killed the driver of the other vehicle, 20-year-old Destiny Alexus Gordon.

References

1969 births
2017 deaths
American football wide receivers
Cleveland Browns players
Baltimore Ravens players
Southern Miss Golden Eagles football players
Mayors of places in Louisiana
People from Tangipahoa Parish, Louisiana
Players of American football from Louisiana
Road incident deaths in Louisiana
20th-century African-American people
21st-century African-American people
Motorcycle road incident deaths